Multiphasic may refer to:
Multiphasic liquid
Multiphasic contraceptive